The Kildare county hurling team represents Kildare in hurling and is governed by Kildare GAA, the county board of the Gaelic Athletic Association. The team competes in the Joe McDonagh Cup and the National Hurling League.

Kildare's home ground is Conneff Park, Clane. The team's manager is David Herity.

The team has never won the Leinster Senior Championship, the All-Ireland Senior Championship or the National League.

History
Kildare hurlers came within minutes of reaching a Leinster Senior Hurling Championship (SHC) final in 1976, holding a four-point lead over eventual All-Ireland SHC finalists Wexford until the closing stages of the semi-final. That performance earned Johnny Walsh a replacement All Star award.

The county's major hurling successes were four All-Ireland Senior B titles (last in 2004), an intermediate All-Ireland (1969), and two junior All-Irelands (1962 and 1966). The closest it came to playing in the top division of the National Hurling League was when it lost a four-point lead in the last ten minutes of a Division 1B promotion play-off against Clare in 1971.

Kildare defeated Waterford in the league in two successive years, was tied at half-time against Tipperary in the 1971 National League quarter-final, and lost to the same team by six points in the quarter-final of 1976. Kildare also lost a promotion play-off against Waterford in 1974.

Kildare participated in the Christy Ring Cup, reaching the 2007 final where defeat to Westmeath followed.

In 2014, Kildare won the Christy Ring Cup for the first time in its history, defeating Kerry by a scoreline of 4–18 to 2–22 in the final.

Kildare later won the 2018 Christy Ring Cup.

Kildare later won the 2020 Christy Ring Cup. The winning manager, David Herity, was previously the Kilkenny goalkeeper.

Current panel

Recent players include:
Jack Sheridan

Current management team
Appointed October 2018:
Manager: David Herity

Managerial history
Morgan Lalor 2001–2005

Ben Dorney Cork 2005–2007

Andy Comerford Kilkenny 2007–2010

Michael O'Riordan 2010–2011

Willie Sutherland Wexford 2011–2013

Brian Lawlor Tipperary 2013–2015

Joe Quaid Limerick 2015–2018

David Herity 2018–

Players

Notable players

Captaincy
Martin Fitzgerald: 2019

Honours

National
All-Ireland Senior Hurling Championship
Quarter-finalists (1): 1989
All-Ireland Senior B Hurling Championship
 Winners (4): 1974, 1980, 1989, 2004
 Runners-up (1): 1990
All-Ireland Intermediate Hurling Championship
 Winners (1): 1969
All-Ireland Junior Hurling Championship
 Winners (2): 1962, 1966
 
Christy Ring Cup
 Winners (4): 2014, 2018, 2020, 2022
 Runners-up (1): 2007

National Hurling League
Quarter-finalists (3): 1971, 1974, 1975
National Hurling League Division 2B
 Winners (2): 2012, 2015
National Hurling League Division 3A
 Winners (1): 2009
All-Ireland Under-16 B Hurling Championship
 Winners (2): 1991, 2002

Provincial
Leinster Senior Hurling Championship
 Semi-finalists (2): 1976, 1977
Kehoe Cup
 Winners (3): 2013, 2016, 2023
Kehoe Shield
 Winners (1): 2009
Leinster Intermediate Hurling Championship
 Winners (1): 1969
Leinster Junior Hurling Championship
 Winners (5): 1905, 1906, 1934, 1962, 1966
Leinster Under-21 B Hurling Championship
 Winners (3): 2007, 2012, 2013

References

External links

 
County hurling teams